Football at the 1986 Asian Games was held in Seoul, South Korea from 20 September to 5 October 1986. Singapore was forced to withdraw as their team was unable to get visas to enter South Korea.

Medalists

Squads

Results

Preliminary round

Group A

Group B

Group C

Group D

Knockout round

Quarterfinals

Semifinals

Bronze medal match

Gold medal match

Final standing

References
 RSSSF

 
1986 Asian Games events
1986
Asian Games
1986 Asian Games
1986 in South Korean football